The Journal of Palliative Medicine (JPM) is the journal of both the Center to Advance Palliative Care and the Hospice and Palliative Nurses Association.  JPM covers aspects of end of life medical care.  

Anesthesiology and palliative medicine journals
Monthly journals
Publications established in 1998
English-language journals
Mary Ann Liebert academic journals
Academic journals associated with learned and professional societies
Until 2008, JPMt was the official journal of the American Association of Hospice and Palliative Medicine.